The Swiss Bishops' Conference (SBC; ; ;) is the coordinating body of the Catholic dioceses in Switzerland. It was founded in 1863 as the world's first Bishops Conference and is a member of the Council of European Bishops' Conferences.

Members
It meets quarterly and comprises 9 members: the bishops of the six dioceses of Switzerland, the auxiliary bishops and the two abbots of Saint-Maurice and Einsiedeln.

 Bishops of dioceses :
 Felix Gmür (Basel)
 Charles Morerod o.p. (Lausanne, Geneva and Fribourg)
 Alain de Raemy (Apostolic administrator of Lugano)
 Markus Büchel (Saint Gallen)
 Jean-Marie Lovey c.r.b. (Sion)
 Joseph Maria Bonnemain (Chur)
 Auxiliary bishop by diocese :
 Alain de Raemy (Lausanne, Geneva and Fribourg)
 Territorial abbots by abbey :
 Urban Federer OSB (Einsiedeln)
 Jean Scarcella c.r.a. (Saint-Maurice)

Dioceses
Roman Catholic Diocese of Basel, based in Solothurn
Roman Catholic Diocese of Chur, based in Chur
Roman Catholic Diocese of Lausanne, Geneva and Fribourg, based in Fribourg
Roman Catholic Diocese of Lugano, based in Lugano
Roman Catholic Diocese of Saint Gallen, based in St. Gallen
Roman Catholic Diocese of Sion, based in Sion

Territorial abbeys
Einsiedeln Abbey
Abbey of St. Maurice, Agaunum

Presidents
Pierre-François de Preux, Bishop of Sion (1863-1875)
Marilley Etienne, bishop of Lausanne (1876-1879)
Karl Johann Greith, Bishop of St. Gallen (1880-1881)
Eugene Lachat, Bishop of Basel (1882-1886)
Gaspard Mermillod, Bishop of Lausanne and Geneva (1887-1890)
Adrien Jardinier, Bishop of Sion (1891-1894)
Augustine Egger, Bishop of St. Gallen (1895-1905)
John Fidelis Battaglia, Bishop of Chur (1906-1911)
Jules-Maurice Abbet, Bishop of Sion (1912-1917)
Jakob Stammler, Bishop of Basle-Lugano (1918-1924)
Georg Schmid Grüneck, Bishop of Chur (1925-1931)
Aurelio Bacciarini, Apostolic Administrator of the Tessin (1932-1933)
Victor Biel, Bishop of Sion (1935-1951)
Angelo Jelmini, Apostolic Administrator of Lugano (1952-1967)
Vonderach John, Bishop of Chur (1967-1970)
Nestor Adam, Bishop of Sion (1970-1976)
Anton Hänggi, bishop of Basel (1976-1977)
Pierre Mamie, Bishop of Lausanne, Geneva and Fribourg (1977-1979)
Otmar Maeder, Bishop of St. Gallen (1980-1982)
Henri Schwery, Bishop of Sion (1983-1988)
Joseph Candolfi, Auxiliary Bishop of Basel (1989-1991), illegally, not because the diocesan bishop. Complaint of Rome.
Pierre Mamie, Bishop of Lausanne, Geneva and Fribourg (1992-1994) (2x)
Henri Salina CRA, abbot of Saint-Maurice (1995-1997)
Amédée Grab OSB, Bishop of Chur (1998-2006)
Kurt Koch, Bishop of Basel (2007-2009)
Norbert Brunner, Bishop of Sion (2010-2012)
Markus Büchel, Bishop of St. Gallen (2013-2015)
Charles Morerod, Bishop of Lausanne, Geneva and Fribourg (2016-2018)
Felix Gmür, Bishop of Basel (since 2019)

See also
Catholic Church in Switzerland

External links
 http://www.bischoefe.ch/
 http://www.kath.ch/
 http://www.eveques.ch/
 http://www.eveques.ch/nous/eveques/eveques-ces

Switzerland
Catholic Church in Switzerland